Pieter Anthoniszoon Overtwater, also known as Anthonisz. or over 't Water (c. 1610 – 28 or 29 April 1682), was a merchant/trader and official of the Dutch East India Company (Vereenigde Oost-Indische Compagnie or VOC).

Career
Overtwater joined the VOC in 1640. Before this, he was a conrector of a school in Hoorn and had no commercial experience.

He was the Dutch opperhoofd at Dejima in Japan from October 1642 to August 1643, and again from November 1644 to November 1645. He proposed to start a new factorij in the north of Japan, an unacceptable proposal for the Japanese interpreter, who refused to translate it. The Japanese however were interested to learn how to use a mortar, but Overtwater was not very willing to explain. 

He was Governor of Formosa from 1646 to 1649 and criticized. The east coast of Formosa was left by the company, being unprofitable and dangerous. 

He was stationed in Ceylon and in 1666 in the Cape colony, where he proposed that children of Malabar slaves could be baptized. In 1677 he was fired as an extraordinary council in Batavia, being accused of corruption or unfair trade.

See also
 VOC Opperhoofden in Japan

References

1600s births
1682 deaths
Colonial governors of Dutch Formosa
People from Hoorn
Dutch expatriates in Japan
Dutch chiefs of factory in Japan